Rena Shimazu (born 28 May 1991) is a Japanese modern pentathlete. She competed in the women's event at the 2020 Summer Olympics.

References

External links
 

1991 births
Living people
Japanese female modern pentathletes
Modern pentathletes at the 2020 Summer Olympics
Olympic modern pentathletes of Japan
Place of birth missing (living people)
Asian Games medalists in modern pentathlon
Modern pentathletes at the 2014 Asian Games
Modern pentathletes at the 2018 Asian Games
Medalists at the 2014 Asian Games
Asian Games silver medalists for Japan
20th-century Japanese women
21st-century Japanese women